The 1910 Great Britain Lions tour of Australia and New Zealand was the first international tour of the Great Britain national rugby league team, "The Lions". They played the second ever Ashes series against Australia, and their first as the visiting team, before travelling to Auckland to take on New Zealand. The tour was a huge promotional and financial success for what was then known as the "Northern Union" game and helped set the pattern for regular, alternating test match series between Britain and Australia. It is regarded as one of the most important events in the history of rugby league.

Despite the selection of several Welsh players in the touring squad, the team is sometimes referred to as "England". They went south from Manchester in early April to London, then travelled by ship for six weeks before reaching Australia. Led by Salford captain James Lomas, the tour was a huge success for the Lions who won all their test matches with Lomas topping the tour scoring charts with 136 points in 13 games.

Touring squad 
The team originally scheduled to tour consisted of eighteen internationals: nine English, eight Welsh and one Scottish. All players were from clubs that participated in the 1909–10 Northern Rugby Football Union season's Championship. The players were also accompanied by joint managers, J. H. Houghton and J. Clifford as well as trainer D. Murray.

Several Australians (including Jim Devereux, Dan Frawley and Andy Morton) also appeared for the tourists as guest players in a match against Newcastle on 18 June 1910.

Australian leg 
The Australian leg of the tour took place during the 1910 NSWRFL season, the third season of rugby league football in Australia since the game's split from rugby union.

Test Venues 
The two Ashes series tests took place at the following venues.

Versus New South Wales 
Before the test series, the British played three matches against New South Wales, losing the first 14 – 28 and the second 20 – 27.

10,000 people saw the match on 29 May whose margin never went beyond more than five points.

This was the third match and first win of the visitors' series against New South Wales, with their captain, Jim Lomas featuring prominently.

Ashes series 
Sydney's Royal Agricultural Showground was the venue for the first Ashes test on Australian soil. Five former Wallaby teammates made their rugby league test debuts for Australia in this match: Charles Russell, John Barnett, Bob Craig, Jack Hickey, and Chris McKivat.

This day also featured a goal-kicking contest between the two sides' captains, Dally Messenger and Jim Lomas, won 3-2 by Lomas

This match also featured a goal-kicking contest, between Dally Messenger, Jim Lomas and Herb Brackenrigg, which the latter won.
Queensland's Bill Heidke was awarded the captaincy for this match, the first non-New South Welshman to achieve this honour.
In the second test, Australia had gotten off to an early lead over the visitors at 11 nil. Jim Leytham's four tries in this match would remain an unbeaten Ashes record.

The British had thus won the series in two tests.

Versus Australasia 
It was decided that after the Ashes series, a combined "Australasia" team, comprising the best players of Australia and New Zealand would play a series of matches against the touring Britons. The Australian jersey's sky blue with maroon hoops had black hoops added to it for these matches.

The British team were conveyed on to the ground by a group of "Jack tars" in port at Sydney who took the place of the horses that were to pull the drag.

The first points came from an individual effort from Viv Farnsworth that led to him scoring in the corner. Great Britain replied with a penalty goal through Jim Lomas. Courtney got the next try, which Brackenrigg failed to convert. Then it was the visitors' turn to score, with a try to Leytham out wide. Lomas missed the kick, so Australasia were leading 8 – 5 at the half time break. They extended their lead to 13 – 5 before The British made a strong comeback to level the scores with a late try before full-time.

At one stage Great Britain were leading 15 – 5 but at half time were trailing 15 – 17. They scored no more points in the second half, as Australasia overran them.

In the evening following the match, the touring Britons left for New Zealand on the Maheno. The next time the two sides would meet was during the 1911–12 Kangaroo tour of Great Britain.

New Zealand leg 

The British team arrived in Auckland on 17 July and were met by officials of the newly formed New Zealand Rugby League before being given a mayoral reception the following morning. During the tour the Lions donated the Northern Union Cup which was awarded to Auckland for inter-provincial competition and is still contested today.

The first match was played in weather described as atrocious against a New Zealand Māori team captained by Whiri Winiata and featuring Albert Asher who had played with the victorious Australasia team back in Australia. The first international try scored on New Zealand soil was by Halifax winger, Joe Riley and this was followed by a hat-trick of tries by Wigan centre Bert Jenkins. Great Britain led 23 – 0 at half-time. In the second half, Fred Smith scored a fourth try for the visitors.

The Auckland side was; Alf Chorley, L Nolan, G Smith, Albert Asher, Alf Jackson, Ronald MacDonald, Len Farrant, Fred Jackson (c), Charles Dunning, Jim Griffin, Alex Stanaway, H Fricker, George Seagar. Emergencies; Syd Riley, Arthur Carlaw, J Bennett, Jim Rukutai, Bob Mitchell.

Versus New Zealand 
New Zealand wore the colours of Red and Yellow with Black bands for the Test match. It was the only time that they wore these colours.

The touring British side had been invited to play another match in Australia, so left Auckland for Sydney on 1 August on the SS Maheno after a hearty send-off.

Return leg 
On their way back to England, a portion of the touring Britons stopped in Sydney for one more game against a New South Wales second XIII, as there was already a New South Wales team playing against Queensland in Brisbane.

References

External links 
 Ashes Series 1910 at rugbyleagueproject.org

Great Britain national rugby league team tours
Rugby league tours of Australia
Rugby league tours of New Zealand
Great Britain Lions tour of Australia and New Zealand
Great Britain Lions tour of Australia and New Zealand
Great Britain Lions tour of Australia and New Zealand